Haak is a Dutch surname. It is thought to often be patronymic of origin, referring to a now extinct given name, or, considering the meaning "hook", be toponymic, descriptive or metonymic (e.g. a fish hook referring to a fisherman). People with this surname include:

Bob Haak (1916–1992), American football player
Bob Haak (1926–2005), Dutch art historian
Guus Haak (born 1937), Dutch football defender
Howie Haak (1911–1999), American baseball scout
Hugo Haak (born 1991), Dutch track cyclist
Isabelle Haak (born 1999), Swedish volleyball player
 (1917–1993), South African politician, Government Minister 1964–70
Jessica Haak, American (North Dakota) Democratic politician
Jur Haak (1890–1945), Dutch footballer
Justin Haak (born 2001), American soccer player
 (1939–1990), Dutch pop singer
 (1876–1937), Dutch pedagogue and historian
Theodore Haak (1605–1690), German Calvinist scholar in England

See also
Haack, German surname

References

Dutch-language surnames